Mauzé-sur-le-Mignon is a commune in the Deux-Sèvres department in western France. It is the birthplace of explorer René Caillié.

See also
Communes of the Deux-Sèvres department

References

Communes of Deux-Sèvres
Aunis